is a private junior college in Nakano, Tokyo, Japan. The precursor of the school was founded in 1927, and it was chartered as a junior college in 1950.

In 2010 the college was renamed  after its first president Inazo Nitobe (presidency: 1928–1933).

References

External links 

  in Japanese

Private universities and colleges in Japan
Educational institutions established in 1927
Universities and colleges in Tokyo
Japanese junior colleges
1927 establishments in Japan